Bruno Vella (3 April 1933 – 13 November 2021) was an Italian politician. A member of the Italian Socialist Party, he served as President of the Province of Rieti from 1975 to 1982, Mayor of Rieti from 1982 to 1983, and served on the Senate of the Republic from 1983 to 1992.

References

1933 births
2021 deaths
20th-century Italian politicians
Italian Socialist Party politicians
Senators of Legislature IX of Italy
Senators of Legislature X of Italy
Presidents of provinces of Italy
Mayors of places in Lazio
People from Fermo